Fritz Riemann (2 January 1859, Weistritz, near Schweidnitz – 25 November 1932, Erfurt) was a German chess master.

Born in Silesia (then Prussia), he was a chess pupil of Adolf Anderssen in Breslau. In 1876, he won a match against Arnold Schottländer (5 : 0) there.

In 1879, he took 5th in Leipzig (1st DSB–Congress, Berthold Englisch won), and took 2nd in Wesselburen. In 1880, he took 2nd, behind Louis Paulsen, in Braunschweig (13th WSB–Congress), and drew a match with Emil Schallopp (+2 –2 =2) in Berlin. In 1881, he tied for 13-14th in Berlin (2nd DSB–Congress, Joseph Henry Blackburne won). In 1883, he tied for 6-7th in Nuremberg (3rd DSB–Congress, Szymon Winawer won). In 1885, he tied for 8-9th in Hamburg (4th DSB–Congress, Isidor Gunsberg won), and drew a match with Ernst Flechsig (+5 –5 =0) in Breslau. In 1888, he shared 1st with Curt von Bardeleben in Leipzig.

He wrote a book :  Riemann, Fritz: Schach-Erinnerungen des jüngsten Anderssen-Schülers. Mit vielen Diagrammen im Text und einem Bildnis des Verfassers. de Gruyter, Berlin und Leipzig 1925.

References

External links

1859 births
1932 deaths
German chess players
People from the Province of Silesia